Milton Nathaniel Barnes (born 1954) is a Liberian diplomat, politician and member of the Liberian Destiny Party (LDP). In early 2022, he announced his intention to run as an independent candidate in the 2023 Liberian presidential election.

Early life
Barnes was born in Monrovia, Liberia, to Roland T. and Eudora N. Barnes. He was the second of four children. Barnes spent his formative years in Harper and Monrovia.

He graduated from high school at the College of West Africa before spending a term at the University of Liberia. He worked as an intern in Liberia's banking system before eventually going to the United States for college.

Barnes attended Rider University (then Rider College) in Lawrenceville, New Jersey, in 1975 where in majored in Finance and graduated in 1978 with a B.Sc. degree. In 1979, Barnes graduated with an MBA in Finance and Banking from Pace University in New York City.

Political career
In September 1999, Barnes was appointed to the position of Minister of Finance, Republic of Liberia. In that capacity, he became the chief architect of Liberia's fiscal program and oversaw and implemented a new national tax code in consultation with the Fiscal Affairs Department of the International Monetary Fund. He held this position until mid-2002.

In 2005, Barnes founded a new political party, the Liberia Destiny Party (LDP). Running as the LDP presidential candidate in the 2005 Liberian presidential general election, Barnes placed 12th out of 22 candidates, receiving 1.0% of the vote. He eventually supported Ellen Johnson Sirleaf, who would become the first democratically elected female president of an African nation, during the subsequent runoff election.

Liberia was one of the founding members of the United Nations, signing the charter in 1945. From May 2006 to 2008, Barnes was appointed Permanent Representative to the United Nations from the Republic of Liberia.

Barnes served as Ambassador from the Republic of Liberia to the Republic of Cuba from 2006 -2008 while also serving as Ambassador to the United Nations. He was instrumental in re-establishing and solidifying diplomatic relations with Cuba.

In 2008, President Johnson Sirleaf named Ambassador Milton Nathaniel Barnes as Liberia's new Ambassador Extraordinary and Plenipotentiary to the United States of America. He served in this capacity until 2010.

In January 2022, Barnes announced his intention to contest the upcoming 2023 Liberian presidential election as an independent candidate on a platform of "Reconciliation, Positive Change, Self-Reliance, and the Emergence of a New Breed of Liberian Leaders who exhibit the key qualities of Character, Competence and Courage."

Honors
In May 2009, Dr. Mordechai Rozanski, president of Rider University, conferred on Barnes an honorary Doctorate of Laws degree.

Personal life
Barnes is married to Dawn Cooper Barnes, a daughter of Henry Nehemiah Cooper, M.D. (1927–1984) and Izetta Cooper, co-founders of the former Cooper Clinic in Monrovia. The two grew up in the same Monrovia community where Barnes' mother was a teacher at Dawn's elementary school and Dawn's father was the Barnes' family doctor.  Dawn Barnes has written, directed and produced the films: Cry of the Pepperbird: A Story of Liberia (2000), The Spiritual Nature of African Dance (2001) and Children of Gold (2002). She also produced a Liberian television comedy series entitled WE ON IT! (2001-2003).  The couple have six children.

In 2010, Barnes founded consulting firm Aurora Solutions, Inc. Since 2010, he has also served regularly as a Lecturer at the Graduate Schools of the University of Liberia and African Methodist Episcopal University.

He enjoys abstract painting. In 2020, his artistic creations were published in Left Brain Right Brain: Thoughts and Musings of a Servant (ISBN 978-0993571039).

References

1954 births
Living people
Finance Ministers of Liberia
University of Liberia alumni
Pace University alumni
Rider University alumni
Politicians from Monrovia
Candidates for President of Liberia
Liberian Destiny Party politicians
Permanent Representatives of Liberia to the United Nations
Ambassadors of Liberia to the United States
21st-century Liberian diplomats